United Nations Security Council Resolution 1703, adopted unanimously on August 18, 2006, after reaffirming previous resolutions on East Timor (Timor-Leste), particularly resolutions 1599 (2005), 1677 (2006) and 1690 (2006), the Council renewed the mandate of the United Nations Office in Timor-Leste (UNOTIL) until August 25, 2006.

The technical resolution was adopted to allow more time for discussions on a new peacekeeping mission, which would later become known as the United Nations Integrated Mission in East Timor, adopted in Resolution 1704 (2006).

See also
 2006 East Timorese crisis
 East Timor Special Autonomy Referendum
 List of United Nations Security Council Resolutions 1701 to 1800 (2006–2008)
 Operation Astute

References

External links
 
Text of the Resolution at undocs.org

 1703
2006 in East Timor
 1703
August 2006 events